Mmanxotae is a village in Central District of Botswana. Village is located 25 km north-east of Nata, and it has a primary school. The population was 442 in 2001 census.

References

Populated places in Central District (Botswana)
Villages in Botswana